Mehr Jesia (born 30 November 1968) is a former Miss India and an Indian supermodel.

Early life and background
Jesia was born into a Parsi family on 30 November 1968. She completed her schooling in J B Vaccha High School for Parsi Girls, Dadar,Mumbai. She grew up in Dadar Parsi Colony in Mumbai. 111

Career
Jesia started her career in 1980s, and won the Femina Miss India title in 1986. Soon she became a part of the first generation of Indian supermodels like Madhu Sapre, Feroze Gujral, Shyamolie Verma and Anna Bredmeyer.

Film career
Jesia and Arjun Rampal produced the film I See You (2006) through their production company Chasing Ganesha. The film starred Rampal, Vipasha Agarwal, Sonali Kulkarni and Boman Irani.

Personal life
She has always shown great interest in sports, and was known to enjoy swimming, badminton, and other sports before she became a model. 

She married former model and Bollywood actor Arjun Rampal in 1998. They have two daughters. On 28 May 2018 the couple announced separation in a joint statement after 20 years of marriage.

References

1968 births
Femina Miss India winners
Indian beauty pageant winners
Living people
Parsi people
Miss Universe 1986 contestants
Parsi people from Mumbai
Female models from Mumbai